Callopistria argyrosemastis is a moth of the family Noctuidae. It was described by George Hampson in 1918. It is found on Fiji.

References

 Callopistria argyrosemastis in Prairie Research Institute's page

Moths described in 1918
Caradrinini
Moths of Fiji